Highway 238 (AR 238, Ark. 238, and Hwy. 238) is an east–west state highway in the Lower Arkansas Delta. The route of  begins at US Highway 49/US Highway 70 (US 49/US 70) in Brinkley and runs east to US 79 near Moro. The route is maintained by the Arkansas State Highway and Transportation Department (AHTD).

Route description

Highway 238 begins at US 49/US 70 in Brinkley in the Arkansas Delta. The route runs east and south to an intersection with Highway 238 Spur before turning due east as a section line road and running to Lee County. Highway 238 continues east, crossing Big Creek and intersecting Highway 259 before entering Moro. In the town, Highway 238 intersects Highway 78 Spur near a city park. The route continues out of town heading south to US 79, where it terminates.

History
The highway was added to the state highway system by the Arkansas State Highway Commission on July 10, 1957 as a road between State Road 39 (now US 49) and the Pleasant Valley community. Highway 238 was extended west to Grand Avenue in Brinkley during a rerouting of east-west highways in the vicinity on September 5, 1962. This action also created Highway 238 Spur. The route was extended east from Pleasant Valley to US 79 on June 23, 1965.

Highway 238 was rerouted from Cypress Street to Sycamore Street in Brinkley on May 29, 1975.

Major intersections

Spur route

The route begins at Highway 238 and runs south to US 49 at the southern edge of Brinkley, where it terminates. The route was created on September 5, 1962. The route was designated during a reorganization of route numbers to increase continuity between Brinkley and Helena.

Major intersections

See also

References

External links

238
Transportation in Lee County, Arkansas
Transportation in Monroe County, Arkansas